Century Avenue is a major Shanghai Metro interchange station named after Century Avenue, which runs above the station. It is currently one of two stations (the other one being Longyang Road station) on the Shanghai Metro network to serve four lines (namely Lines 2, 4, 6 and 9), and the first four-line interchange metro or subway station in mainland China.

Beginning on 22 October 2005, the station closed for reconfiguration and improvements in preparation for the planned 4-line interchange with Lines 4, 6, and 9. On 28 October 2006, the station was reopened and first served as an interchange between Lines 2 and 4, and the name was changed to the present Century Avenue according to the new convention to name metro stations after famous streets or sights in the vicinity.

The station uses an optimized interchange solution. Line 6 uses two side platforms on the upper underground level and heads north-south, while Lines 2, 4 and 9 all use island platforms on the lower level and head east-west.

Station Layout

References

Line 2, Shanghai Metro
Line 4, Shanghai Metro
Line 6, Shanghai Metro
Line 9, Shanghai Metro
Shanghai Metro stations in Pudong
Railway stations in China opened in 1999
Railway stations in China opened in 2006